CM is a youth and community music organisation in England.

CM was set up as Community Music in 1983 by John Stevens and Dave O'Donnell. Dedicated to the creation of new music through structured access and artist development. It works as an alternative to mainstream provision by targeting young people who do not have the opportunity to learn and musicians who do not have recognised qualifications. Among the venues previously partnering with CM was the Lewisham Academy of Music.

Jazz saxophonist Courtney Pine started his music career as a teacher at Community Music when he was 19 years old.

Asian Dub Foundation was formed in 1993 at the Community Music centre. Their 2000 album was named Community Music.

References

External links

Music schools in England
1983 establishments in England